Nicola Selva (born 4 July 1962) is a Sammarinese politician and a retired sprinter. He was one of the Captains Regent, serving with Michele Muratori. He took office on 1 April 2019, and left on 1 October 2019.

Life
He served as a member of the Grand and General Council from 2006 until 2011 and again from 2012. Selva graduated in industrial technology from the Leon Battista Alberti Institute in Rimini. In 2016, he was one of the co-founders of the Future Republic party.

Sporting career
He also competed in the men's 4 × 100 metres relay at the 1992 Summer Olympics.

References

1962 births
Living people
People from the City of San Marino
Captains Regent of San Marino
Members of the Grand and General Council
Future Republic politicians
Athletes (track and field) at the 1992 Summer Olympics
Sammarinese male sprinters
Olympic athletes of San Marino
Athletes (track and field) at the 1991 Mediterranean Games
Place of birth missing (living people)
Sportsperson-politicians
Mediterranean Games competitors for San Marino